Neguela is a small town and seat of the commune of Bossofala in the Cercle of Kati in the Koulikoro Region of south-western Mali. The lies 61 km northwest of Bamako, the Malian capital.

References

Populated places in Koulikoro Region